Charles Mallory Hatfield (July 15, 1875January 12, 1958) was an American "rainmaker".

Early life
Hatfield was born in Fort Scott, Kansas on July 15, 1875. His family moved to Southern California in the 1880s. As an adult, he became a salesman for the New Home Sewing Machine Company. In 1904, he moved to Glendale, California.

Career 
In his free time Hatfield studied pluviculture and began to develop his own methods for producing rain. By 1902 he had created a secret mixture of 23 chemicals in large galvanized evaporating tanks that, he claimed, attracted rain. Hatfield called himself a "moisture accelerator".

In 1904, promoter Fred Binney began a public relations campaign for Hatfield. A number of Los Angeles ranchers saw his ads in newspapers and promised Hatfield $50 to produce rain. In February, Hatfield and his brother Paul built an evaporating tower at La Crescenta where Hatfield released his mixture into the air. Hatfield's attempt was apparently successful, so the ranchers paid him $100. Contemporary weather bureau reports described the rain as a small part of a storm that was already coming but Hatfield's supporters disregarded this.

Hatfield began to receive more job offers. He promised Los Angeles  of rain, apparently succeeded, and collected a fee of $1000. For this effort, Hatfield had built his tower on the grounds of the Esperanza Sanitarium in Altadena, near Rubio Canyon.

In 1906 Hatfield was invited to the Yukon Territory, where he agreed to create rain for the water-dependent mines of the Klondike goldfields. The Klondike contract was for $10,000, but after unsuccessful efforts, Hatfield slipped away, collecting only $1,100 for expenses. This failure did not deter his supporters.

In 1915 the San Diego city council, pressured by the San Diego Wide Awake Improvement Club, approached Hatfield to produce rain to fill the Morena Dam reservoir. Hatfield offered to produce rain for free, then charge $1,000 per inch ($393.7 per centimetre) for between forty and fifty inches (1.02 to 1.27 m) and free again over fifty inches (1.27 m). The council voted four to one for a $10,000 fee, payable when the reservoir was filled. A formal agreement was never drawn up, though Hatfield continued based on verbal understanding. Hatfield, with his brother, built a tower beside Lake Morena and was ready early in the New Year.

On January 5, 1916 heavy rain began—and grew gradually heavier day by day. Dry riverbeds filled to the point of flooding. Worsening floods destroyed bridges, marooned trains and cut phone cables - not to mention flooding homes and farms. Two dams, Sweetwater Dam and one at Lower Otay Lake, overflowed. Rain stopped on 20 January but resumed two days later. On January 27 Lower Otay Dam broke, increasing the devastation and reportedly causing about 20 deaths (accounts vary on the exact number).

Hatfield talked to the press on February 4 and said that the damage was not his fault and that the city should have taken adequate precautions. Hatfield had fulfilled the requirements of his contract—filling the reservoir—but the city council refused to pay the money unless Hatfield would accept liability for damages; there were already claims worth $3.5 million. Besides, there was no written contract. Hatfield tried to settle for $4000 and then sued the council. The suit continued until 1938 when two courts decided that the rain was an act of God, which absolved him of any wrongdoing, but also meant Hatfield did not get his fee.

Hatfield's fame only grew and he received more contracts for rainmaking. Among other things, in 1929 he tried to stop a forest fire in Honduras. Later the Bear Valley Mutual Water Company wanted to fill Big Bear Lake. However, during the Great Depression he had to return to his work as a sewing machine salesman. His wife divorced him.

Charles Hatfield died January 12, 1958 and took his chemical formula with him to his grave in the Forest Lawn Memorial Park Cemetery in Glendale, California.

Hatfield claimed at least 500 successes. According to later commentators, Hatfield's successes were mainly due to his meteorological skill and sense of timing, selecting periods where there was a high probability of rain anyway.

References in popular culture 

Charles Hatfield and the 1916 flooding at Lake Morena is the subject of the song "Hatfield" by the band Widespread Panic.  Singer/guitarist John Bell wrote the song after reading the story of the rainmaker in a Farmers' Almanac. The song was released on the album Everyday in 1993.

Hatfield's story inspired the 1956 Burt Lancaster film The Rainmaker, based on the play of the same name. Hollywood invited Hatfield to the premiere. The play also became the basis of a Broadway Musical, 110 in the Shade.

Charles Hatfield's fictional great-great-granddaughter has taken up his research in T. Jefferson Parker's 2007 novel Storm Runners.

Charles Hatfield and the San Diego flood was featured in a 2016 episode of the White Rabbit Project on Netflix.

Charles Hatfield and his rainmaking endeavors are mentioned in Chapter One of Mark Arax's  2019 book, "The Dreamt Land."

See also 

 Cloud seeding

References

Further reading

External links 
 San Diego History
 A Rainmaker Meets His Match, Ephrata, Wash., 1920

American meteorologists
Weather modification in North America
1875 births
1958 deaths
Burials at Forest Lawn Memorial Park (Glendale)
People from Fort Scott, Kansas
People from Glendale, California
People from Valley Center, California
History of Los Angeles
History of San Diego County, California